Ana Gros (born 21 January 1991) is a Slovenian handballer for Győri ETO KC and the Slovenian national team.

Achievements
Slovenian Championship:
Winner: 2009, 2010, 2022
Slovenian Cup:
Winner: 2009, 2010
Nemzeti Bajnokság I:
Winner: 2011, 2012
Magyar Kupa:
Winner: 2011, 2012
German Championship:
Winner: 2013
French Championship:
Winner: 2014, 2016, 2017, 2021
French Cup:
Winner: 2015, 2017, 2021
French League Cup:
Winner: 2014
EHF Champions League:
Finalist: 2012, 2021
Semifinalist: 2011

Individual awards
French Championship Top Scorer: 2016, 2018
French Championship Right Back: 2015, 2016, 2017, 2018, 2019, 2020
All-Star Right Back of the EHF Champions League: 2018

References

External links

Ana Gros player profile on Győri Audi ETO KC Official Website
Ana Gros career statistics at Worldhandball

1991 births
Living people
Slovenian female handball players
Expatriate handball players
Slovenian expatriate sportspeople in France
Slovenian expatriate sportspeople in Germany
Slovenian expatriate sportspeople in Hungary
Győri Audi ETO KC players
Handball players from Ljubljana
Mediterranean Games competitors for Slovenia
Competitors at the 2009 Mediterranean Games